Pat Foster (born June 22, 1939) is an American former college basketball coach.  He served as the head men's basketball coach at Lamar University (1980–1986), University of Houston (1986–1993), and the University of Nevada, Reno (1993–1999), compiling a career record of 366–203. 
At Houston, he succeeded Guy Lewis.  Foster also served as athletic director at Lamar from 1983 to 1985.

Head coaching record

References 

1939 births
Living people
American men's basketball players
Arkansas Razorbacks men's basketball coaches
Arkansas Razorbacks men's basketball players
Basketball coaches from Arkansas
Basketball players from Arkansas
Houston Cougars men's basketball coaches
Lamar Cardinals and Lady Cardinals athletic directors
Lamar Cardinals basketball coaches
Nevada Wolf Pack men's basketball coaches
People from Columbia County, Arkansas